The Stadium Kajang MRT station is an elevated mass rapid transit (MRT) station on the Kajang Line (SBK line), located in downtown Kajang, Selangor, Malaysia.  It was opened on 17 July 2017, along with 19 adjoining stations (from Muzium Negara to Kajang) as part of Phase 2 of the system. It is the second-to-last station towards Kajang on the SBK line.

The station stands close to the right bank of the Langat River and is located adjacent to the Kajang Stadium (the station's namesake), as well as the Kajang RTM branch, the Bangunan Dato' Nazir building which housed the Sate Kajang Haji Samuri, other satay stalls at Medan Sate Kajang, and SJK (C) Yu Hua national elementary school. The station is also close to Kajang's historic core, the Sungai Chua ward and the junction between Semenyih Highway Federal Route 1 and Jalan Reko .

During construction, the station was provisionally named Bandar Kajang, as it served the downtown area of Kajang; the adjoining Kajang station, despite its name, does not directly serve downtown Kajang. This is one of two stations serving Kajang's town centre, the other being Sungai Jernih.

Station background

Station layout 
The station has a layout and design similar to that of most other elevated stations on the line (except the terminus and underground stations), with the platform level on the topmost floor, consisting of two sheltered side platforms along a double tracked line and a single concourse housing ticketing facilities between the ground level and the platform level. All levels are linked by lifts, stairways and escalators.

Exits and entrances 
The station has three entrances. The feeder buses operate from the station's feeder bus hub via Entrance A on Jalan Stadium.

Bus services

MRT feeder bus services 
With the opening of the MRT Kajang Line, feeder buses also began operating linking the station with several housing areas and cities around the Kajang area. The feeder buses operate from the station's feeder bus hub accessed via Entrance A of the station.

Other bus services 
The MRT Stadium Kajang station also provides accessibility for some other bus services.

References

External links 

 Klang Valley Mass Rapid Transit website
 Stadium Kajang Station - MRT website

Kajang
Rapid transit stations in Selangor
Sungai Buloh-Kajang Line
Railway stations opened in 2017